Arum-type refers to the morphology of fungal hyphae living in, or around plant root cells.
Forms in arbuscular or tree-like fashion, branching off dichotomously at predetermined junctions.

This is a type of mycorrhizal infection whereby the fungus in question invaginates the cell membrane of a plant cell, and branches in arbuscular manner.
Arum-type growth of hyphae is used in endomycorrhizal symbiosis with a plant. 

Often, but not always, accompanied by intercellular hyphal growth.

See also
Arbuscular mycorrhizal fungi
Paris type

References
C.J. Alexopolous, Charles W. Mims, M. Blackwell  et al., Introductory Mycology, 4th ed. (John Wiley and Sons, Hoboken NJ, 2004)  

Fungal morphology and anatomy